Aglia is a genus of moths in the family Saturniidae first described by Ochsenheimer in 1810. It is the only genus in the subfamily Agliinae.

Species
Aglia tau (Linnaeus, 1758)
Aglia ingens Naumann, 2003
Aglia japonica Leech, 1889
Aglia homora Jordan (in Seitz), 1911
Aglia sinjaevi Brechlin, 2015
Aglia spaniolissima Gómez-Bustillo, 1980
Aglia vanschaycki Brechlin, 2015

References

Agliinae
Moth genera